Anja Maike Hegenauer is a German football midfielder who plays for SC Freiburg in the Bundesliga. As a junior international she won the 2011 U-19 European Championship.

Career
Hegenauer began playing youth football with local side TSG Söflingen, and played for the Germany women's national under-20 football team.

Hegenauer has played for SC Freiburg since 2009, featuring regularly for the club in the Bundesliga. She also studies at Albert Ludwig's University of Freiburg.

References

External links
 

1992 births
Living people
German women's footballers
SC Freiburg (women) players
Women's association football midfielders
Frauen-Bundesliga players
Sportspeople from Ulm
Footballers from Baden-Württemberg